Elspe is a small town in a region names Sauerland.  Elspe has a total population of 2904 people with over 21 percent of its people being 65 years or older.  Elspe is part of the town Lennestadt.  The name Elspe comes from various names, such as "Alisa" and "Apa", which are both words in Latin that relate to water.  Elspe is surrounded by Mountains sitting at a height of 550 meters in the Elspetal.  Elspe is a small town, but became known for its Karl-May-Festival, with the actor Pierre Brice

The story of Elspe

A 1000 years ago by Kaiser Otto the third was Elspe first mentioned in a formal document.  In the region of Olpe there are many towns, but Elspe is known to be the oldest of all of them.

The Farms of Elspe

Together with other farmers, farmers banded together to make farmer groups and they eventually made small towns.  In these farmer bands, every few years a new council member was elected.

Elspe's fire of 1805

A disaster happened on the ninth of June, 1805.  As a young farm boy saw a rat on his floor he started shooting at it with his rifle.  Him shooting at the rat ended up in him accidentally firing at the hay and eventually setting it on fire.  The fire quickly spread out due to a strong wind, and led to the town setting on fire and a lot being destroyed.

The reconstruction of Elspe

After the fire, people were planning to rebuild the town.  The towns leaders made a few changes,  First they said they would build the houses further apart, making it harder for the flames to spread.  Also, all the houses were now positioned next to the road instead of further away from it, making it easier to escape in case of a fire and the fire not being spread as easily on roads.  A lot of changes were also made to roads and houses, such as the Heiden street lying next to the Church walls being widened,  The entrance between Bertels and Strucks was widened, and a new street was built under the church walls.

Incorporation

Elspe was admitted to the city Lennestadt on the first of July in 1969.  Along with Elspe, 18 other very small regions joined.

Elspe Logo

The logo is made up of a white plow on a blue background and a pair of blue, crossed hammers on a white background.  This logo dates back to the years 1000 and was made by Kaiser Otto the third.  The colors of the logo have

New town square

Due to the teardown of an old building and how near the Parish church was there was an opportunity for a new town square at the Gellestatt.  As we can now see, the plan for the new town square showed us that there was a court lying there.  In the spring of 2011, Elspe achieved that next to offices there was a walkway from the Church down to the town square. The walkway also included new stairs and railings.

Villages in North Rhine-Westphalia
Olpe (district)